Theo Anast (born 1966) is a France former international rugby league footballer who played for the Canterbury Bulldogs in the Australian New South Wales Rugby League premiership and St Gaudens in the French Elite Championship. Anast represented the French national side on several occasions. His position of choice was as a prop-forward.

Background
Anast born in Armidale, New South Wales, Australia.

He is of Greek heritage through parentage.

Early career
He grew up playing rugby league at an early age and his natural talent for the game was immediately recognisable when he was selected to play for the Australian Schoolboys side during the 1984 season.

While attending Armidale High School, Anast played for the Australian Schoolboys team in 1984.

Career
He was however unable to fulfill his ability while playing in Australia where after he was signed to the Canterbury Bulldogs club in the New South Wales Rugby League premiership he played on one occasion during the 1988–89 season and eventually decided to move to France to play with the St Gaudens club.

In his first season in the French Elite Championship he had some impressive showings first earning himself a call up to the President's XIII during the 1990 season for a friendly match against the touring Australians and in 1993 eventually made his debut for the French national side while on tour in Great Britain. Around this time he was strongly linked with a move to English side Workington Town.

Career playing statistics

Point scoring summary

Matches played

References

External links
Bulldogs profile
Review of the 1994 Tour to the Pacific
List of Australian schoolboy representatives

Canterbury-Bankstown Bulldogs players
French rugby league players
Hunslet R.L.F.C. players
1966 births
Living people
Rugby league props
Date of birth missing (living people)